The French submarine Bellone  was the lead ship of her class of three submarines built for the French Navy during World War I.

See also 
List of submarines of France

Notes

Bibliography

 

Ships built in France
1914 ships